DURAN is a brand name for the internationally defined borosilicate glass 3.3 (DIN ISO 3585) produced by the German company DURAN Group GmbH since 2005 under license from the Schott AG, which was the first to develop it, and which sold it from 1893 until the equity carve-out of the DURAN Group in 2005. Because of its high resistance to heat and temperature changes, as well as its high mechanical strength and low coefficient of thermal expansion, DURAN, which Pyrex from Corning is similar to, is not only used for laboratory devices (e.g. components of chemical devices, beakers, Erlenmeyer flasks, etc.) but also in cathode ray tubes, transmitting tubes, and speculums.

This glass was developed by Otto Schott in 1887. In 1938 the brand DURAN was subscribed at the Reichspatentamt and registered in 1943.

Milestones

1887: Otto Schott invented the glass  

1943: The brand was registered  for patent under the trade name DURAN

1950: DURAN borosilicate glass tubing became and has remained the standard material in the production of laboratory glass items

2011: SCHOTT Tubing in Mitterteich, Germany, was the first to produce DURAN tubing with a length of 10 meters, making it the longest industrially produced glass tube

2015: SCHOTT in Mitterteich set a world record by manufacturing DURAN tubing with an outside diameter of 460 mm, the largest ever industrially produced glass tubing

2017: DURAN Group is now DWK Life Sciences.

Properties 
 High chemical resistance
 Outstanding transmission properties 
 High thermal capacity and resistance to thermal shock
 Strong electrical insulator 
 transparency in the visible and infrared range of the electromagnetic spectrum
 High resistance to scratches
 Easily cleaned smooth surface

Applications
 Laboratory devices
 Product presentation
 Giftware
 Explosion proof lighting 
 Interior design
 Sprinkler fuses
 Photobioreactors for ideal algae growth 
 Heat exchangers 
 Sight glasses 
 Ventilation systems 
 Glass Kettles
 Water Pipes
 
Duran is currently available in hollow glass products. It is either formed by a molding process  into final glass products like Erlenmeyer flasks or drawn as a tube by SCHOTT Tubing. Such tubes are typically a semi-finished product for further processing, which provide higher precision in its cylindrical geometry and better optical clarity than molded hollow glassware.

References

External links 
 Duran-Group.com
 Laboratory Glassware

German brands
Glass trademarks and brands